Qaleh-ye Abadeh (also Romanized as Qal‘eh-ye Ābādeh and Qal‘eh Ābādeh; also known as Ābādeh and Ābādeh-ye Morshedī) is a village in Mazayjan Rural District, in the Central District of Bavanat County, Fars Province, Iran. At the 2006 census, its population was 244, in 69 families.

References 

Populated places in Bavanat County